Martha Louise Minow (born December 6, 1954) is an American legal scholar and the 300th Anniversary University Professor at Harvard University. She served as the Dean of Harvard Law School between 2009 and 2017 and has taught at the Law School since 1981. Minow was one of the candidates mentioned to replace U.S. Supreme Court Associate Justice John Paul Stevens upon his retirement. She has been called "one of the world's leading human rights scholars" and "one of the world's leading figures in bringing legal ideas and scholarship to bear on issues of identity, race and equality, including innovative approaches to reconciliation among divided peoples."

Biography
Minow is the daughter of former Federal Communications Commission chairman Newton Minow, and his wife, Josephine (Baskin) Minow. Minow is Jewish. She graduated from New Trier Township High School in Illinois in  1972.

Minow received her undergraduate degree from the University of Michigan (1975), her master's degree in education from the Harvard Graduate School of Education (1976), and her Juris Doctor (J.D.) degree from Yale Law School (1979), where she was an editor of the Yale Law Journal.

After graduating from law school, Minow clerked for Judge David L. Bazelon of the United States Court of Appeals for the D.C. Circuit and then for Justice Thurgood Marshall of the United States Supreme Court.

She joined the Harvard Law faculty as an assistant professor in 1981, was promoted to professor in 1986, was named the William Henry Bloomberg Professor of Law in 2003, and became the Jeremiah Smith Jr., Professor of Law in 2005. Minow became Dean of Harvard Law School July 1, 2009. She is also a lecturer in the Harvard Graduate School of Education.

On June 30, 2017, Minow stepped down from her post as Morgan and Helen Chu Dean and Professor of Law. From 2017 to 2018, she served as Carter Professor of General Jurisprudence. In 2018, she assumed her current position as the 300th Anniversary University Professor at Harvard University.

Works, honors, and recognition

Minow served on the Independent International Commission on Kosovo and helped to launch Imagine Co-existence, a program of the U.N. High Commissioner for Refugees, to promote peaceful development in post-conflict societies. Her five-year partnership with the federal Department of Education and the Center for Applied Special Technology worked to increase access to the curriculum for students with disabilities and resulted in both legislative initiatives and a voluntary national standard opening access to curricular materials for individuals with disabilities. She has worked on the Divided Cities initiative which is building an alliance of global cities dealing with ethnic, religious, or political divisions.

During the 2008 Presidential campaign, then-Senator Obama said, "When I was at Harvard Law School I had a teacher who changed my life -- Martha Minow."  In August 2009, President Barack Obama nominated Dean Minow to the board of the Legal Services Corporation, a bi-partisan, government-sponsored organization that provides civil legal assistance to low-income Americans. The U.S. Senate confirmed her appointment on March 19, 2010, and she now serves as Vice-Chair and co-chair of its Pro Bono Task Force. In 2019 she was awarded the Leo Baeck Medal.

She is a former member of the board of the Bazelon Center for Mental Health Law, the Iranian Human Rights Documentation Center, and former chair of the Scholar's Board of Facing History and Ourselves. A fellow of the American Academy of Arts & Sciences since 1992, Minow has also been a senior fellow of Harvard's Society of Fellows, a member of Harvard University Press Board of Syndics, a senior fellow and twice acting director of what is now Harvard's Safra Foundation Center on Ethics, a fellow of the American Bar Foundation and a Fellow of the American Philosophical Society.  She has delivered more than 70 named or endowed lectures and key-note addresses.

In 2020, Minow spoke with the podcast Criminal in their episode, "Learning How to Forgive."

Selected works
 When Should Law Forgive?, Norton (September 2019). 
 The First Global Prosecutor: Promise and Constraints, with C. Cora True-Frost and Alex Whiting, editors. (University of Michigan Press, 2015).
 In Brown's Wake: Legacies of America's Constitutional Landmark. (Oxford University Press, 2010)
 Government by Contract: Outsourcing and American Democracy. (Jody Freeman & Martha L. Minow eds., Harvard University Press, 2009)
 Just Schools: Pursuing Equality in Societies of Difference. (Martha Minow, Richard A. Shweder, and Hazel Markus, Editors; Russell Sage Foundation, 2008)
 "Living Up to Rules: Holding Soldiers Responsible for Abusive Conduct and the Dilemma of the Superior Orders Defence". 52 McGill Law Journal 1 (2007)
 "Tolerance in an Age of Terror". 16 University of Southern California Interdisciplinary Law Journal 453 (2007)
 "Should Religious Groups Ever Be Exempt From Civil Rights Laws?" 48 Boston College Law Review 781 (2007)
 "Outsourcing Power: How Privatizing Military Efforts Challenges Accountability, Professionalism, and Democracy". 46 Boston College Law Review 989 (2005)
 Partners, Not Rivals: Privatization and the Public Good. (2002)
 Engaging Cultural Differences. (ed. with Richard Shweder and Hazel Markus, 2002)
 Between Vengeance and Forgiveness: Facing History After Genocide and Mass Violence. (1998)
 Not Only For Myself: Identity, Politics, and Law. (1997)
 Making All the Difference: Inclusion, Exclusion, and American Law. (1990)
 "Law Turning Outward". Telos, 73 (Fall 1987)

See also
 Barack Obama Supreme Court candidates
 List of law clerks of the Supreme Court of the United States (Seat 10)
 Leslie Moonves
 Jim Lanzone
 Joseph Ianniello
 Elena Kagan
 Thurgood Marshall

References

External links

Martha Minow faculty page at Harvard Law School
Martha Minow named dean of Harvard Law School
Harvard's Edmond J. Safra Foundation Center for Ethics

1954 births
20th-century American Jews
American legal scholars
American women lawyers
Law clerks of the Supreme Court of the United States
Harvard Graduate School of Education alumni
Harvard Law School faculty
International law scholars
Deans of law schools in the United States
Women deans (academic)
Living people
New Trier High School alumni
People from Highland Park, Illinois
American scholars of constitutional law
University of Michigan alumni
Yale Law School alumni
Deans of Harvard Law School
American women legal scholars
Charles H. Revson Foundation
Fellows of the American Academy of Political and Social Science
Members of the American Philosophical Society
21st-century American Jews